The LG Velvet is an Android phablet manufactured by LG Electronics, announced in May 2020 as a rebrand for the LG G series. The device shares some of its hardware with the flagship V60 ThinQ, with the same display, but a smaller battery and different cameras. On April 5, 2021 LG announced it will be shutting down its mobile phone division and ceasing production of all remaining devices. LG noted the phone will be available until existing inventory runs out.

Specifications

Design 
The Velvet uses an anodized aluminum frame and curved Gorilla Glass on both the front and back, with an IP68 rating for water/dust resistance. A unique vertically-oriented camera setup is on the rear. Instead of being housed in an array, each camera has a separate lens, using a "raindrop effect". The top sensor protrudes slightly, while the other sensors and LED flash are flush with the back panel. 

The 4G model is available in Black and Aurora Silver; the 5G model is available in Aurora White, Aurora Green, Aurora Gray and Illusion Sunset. Blue, Red and Pink carrier-exclusive finishes were added later for SK Telecom, KT and LG U+ respectively. The Verizon 5G UW model is only available in Aurora Red.

Hardware 
The 4G model uses the Snapdragon 845 and Adreno 630, while the 5G model uses the Snapdragon 765G and Adreno 620. The T-Mobile 5G model uses the MediaTek Dimensity 1000C and Mali-G57 MC5. The sole storage option is 128 GB of UFS 2.1, paired with 6 or 8 GB of LPDDR4X RAM. MicroSD card expansion is supported through a hybrid dual-SIM slot, up to 1 TB with a single-SIM or dual-SIM setup. 

The display uses a curved  1080p P-OLED panel with a 41:18 aspect ratio, with support for LG's DualScreen case accessory. It supports Wacom AES active pen input, but no pen is included and there is no built in storage for one. An under-screen optical fingerprint scanner and facial recognition are used for biometrics like on the V60. The battery capacity is 4300mAh, and can be recharged either wired over USB-C at up to 15 W (4G) / 25 W (5G) or wirelessly via Qi at up to 9 W. A triple camera setup is used on the rear, consisting of a 48 MP wide sensor, an 8 MP ultrawide sensor and a 5 MP macro sensor. The front camera uses a 16 MP sensor and is located in a small cutout at the top of the display.

Software
The Velvet ships with Android 10 (Queen Cake) and uses LG's UX 9.

Velvet 2 Pro 
An updated version called the Velvet 2 Pro was leaked in media. Its exterior changes appear to be limited to touch buttons for volume and power. Due to the discontinuation of LG's phone division, the phone would reportedly only be sold to Korean LG staff at a steeply discounted price.

References

LG Electronics smartphones
LG Electronics mobile phones
Mobile phones introduced in 2020
Android (operating system) devices
Mobile phones with multiple rear cameras
Mobile phones with 4K video recording
Dual screen phone